The Thames is a river in southern England, including the capital, London.

Thames may also refer to:

Places

United Kingdom
 Thames Chase, a community forest in east London
 Thames Estuary, estuary of the River Thames and River Medway
 Thames (Barking and Dagenham ward), a local government ward in London
 Thames (Reading ward), a local government ward in the Borough of Reading

New Zealand
 Firth of Thames, a bay in the North Island
 Thames (New Zealand electorate)
 Thames, New Zealand, a town
 Thames High School
 Thames River (New Zealand), former name of the Waihou River

Other places
 Thames River (Connecticut), southeastern Connecticut
 Thames River (Ontario), Ontario, Canada
 Thames Street, Rhode Island, Newport, Rhode Island
 Thames Town, in Shanghai, China
 Támesis, Antioquia, in Colombia

Transportation
 HMS Thames, several warships of the Royal Navy
 HMT Thames (1938), a rescue tugboat in the British Royal Navy
 The Thames (steamship), British exploration ship lost in Siberia
 Thames (1818 ship), an 1818 East Indiaman under a license from the British East India Company
 Thames Trader, former British Ford lorry model brand name
 Thames, a GWR 3031 Class locomotive  built for and run on the Great Western Railway between 1891 and 1915, renamed the Worcester in 1895
 Thames-class lifeboat, class of lifeboat operated by the Royal National Lifeboat Institution (RNLI) between 1974 and 1997

People
 Eric Thames (born 1986), professional baseball player
 Marcus Thames (born 1977), professional baseball player
 José Ignacio Thames (1762–1832), Argentine statesman and priest

Other uses
 Battle of the Thames, part of the War of 1812
 South Thames College, further education college in south west London
 Thames (production company), a British television production company
 Thames Water, London water utility
 Thames Television, former TV broadcaster and production company
 Thames A.F.C., former London football club
 Thames House, headquarters of the British MI5 organization
 Thames Rowing Club, rowing club using the River Thames in Putney, London

See also
 Thame, Oxfordshire, England
 River Thame, a tributary of the River Thames
 The Isis, alternative name for the River Thames near Oxford